William Marsland  (1855 – 28 March 1917) was a British trade unionist.

Born in Hurst near Ashton-under-Lyne, Marsland worked from an early age as a half-timer in a hat factory.  When he was 13, he began working full-time at a cotton mill and joined the Ashton Spinners' Association, while spending much of his spare time studying.  As a result, in 1898, when the secretaryship of the Ashton Spinners became available, he took the top place in an examination, and won the post.  Later in the year, he was also elected to the Ashton Board of Guardians.

In 1904, Marsland again won a general secretaryship by examination, becoming leader of the Amalgamated Association of Operative Cotton Spinners, to which the Ashton Spinners was affiliated.  In 1905, he was additionally appointed as secretary of the International Federation of Textile Workers' Associations.  He also served on the committee of the General Federation of Trade Unions, and on the council of the British Cotton Growing Association, for which in 1911 he went on a fact-finding trip to the Caribbean.

He died in his 52nd year.

References

1855 births
1917 deaths
English trade unionists
General Secretaries of the Amalgamated Association of Operative Cotton Spinners
People from Ashton-under-Lyne
Date of birth missing
English justices of the peace